Uman Island is an island of Uman municipality in Chuuk State, Federated States of Micronesia.

During World War II the United States Navy built Naval Base at Uman Island, Truk Lagoon, Fleet Post Office #3048. The United States Fourth Fleet used Uman Island for anchorage, a PT Boat Base.

References

Statoids.com, retrieved December 8, 2010

Islands of Chuuk State